The 2004 Indianapolis Colts season was the 52nd season for the team in the National Football League and 21st in Indianapolis. The 2004 Colts season began with the team trying to maintain or improve on their 12–4 record from 2003, and advance further into the playoffs. The Colts finished the season 12–4, and defeated the Denver Broncos for the second straight time in the playoffs, but they were halted in the Divisional round by the defending and eventual Super Bowl champion New England Patriots,  their second straight loss in the playoffs to them.

Peyton Manning had one of the best seasons ever by an NFL quarterback (and the best season of his Indianapolis career), throwing 49 touchdown passes and breaking the previous record of 48 held by Dan Marino. Manning broke his own record in 2013, with 55 touchdown passes. At season's end, Peyton Manning was named the NFL MVP.  For the season the Colts set an NFL record with 51 total touchdown passes. The Colts led the NFL with 522 points scored. The Colts tallied more points in the first half of each of their games of the 2004 season (277 points) than seven other NFL teams managed in the entire season.

Despite throwing 49 touchdown passes, Peyton Manning attempted fewer than 500 passes for the first time in his NFL career. Sports statistics site Football Outsiders calculates that Manning had the best-ever season by a quarterback, play-for-play, in 2004.

The 2004 Colts are the only team in NFL history to convert five or more passing touchdowns in a game four different times during the regular season.

Offseason

Free Agency
During Free Agency, the Colts failed to re-sign linebacker Marcus Washington and cornerback Walt Harris. Both signed with the Washington Redskins in free agency.

NFL Draft

Undrafted free agents

Roster

Preseason

Schedule

Standings

Game summaries

Week 1: at New England Patriots

Week 2: at Tennessee Titans

Week 3: vs. Green Bay Packers

Week 4: at Jacksonville Jaguars

Week 5: vs. Oakland Raiders

Week 7: vs. Jacksonville Jaguars

Week 8: at Kansas City Chiefs

Week 9: vs. Minnesota Vikings

Week 10: vs. Houston Texans

Week 11: at Chicago Bears

Week 12: at Detroit Lions

Week 13: vs. Tennessee Titans

Week 14: at Houston Texans

Week 15: vs. Baltimore Ravens

Week 16: vs. San Diego Chargers

Week 17: at Denver Broncos

Postseason schedule

Postseason results

AFC Wild-Card Playoff Game: vs. Denver Broncos

AFC Divisional Playoff game: at New England Patriots

Awards and records
 Peyton Manning, Bert Bell Award

See also 
History of the Indianapolis Colts
Indianapolis Colts seasons
Colts–Patriots rivalry

References

Indianapolis Colts seasons
Indianapolis Colts
AFC South championship seasons
Colts